Matthew Vincent Milano (born July 28, 1994) is an American football linebacker for the Buffalo Bills of the National Football League (NFL). He played college football at Boston College.

College career
Milano attended and played college football at Boston College under head coach Steve Addazio.

Collegiate statistics

Professional career

The Buffalo Bills selected Milano in the fifth round (163rd overall) of the 2017 NFL Draft. The pick used to draft him was given by the New England Patriots as compensation for the Patriots signing restricted free agent running back Mike Gillislee. He was the first of two linebackers Buffalo selected, along with Boise State's Tanner Vallejo.

2017
On May 11, 2017, the Buffalo Bills signed Milano to a four-year, $2.66 million contract that included a signing bonus of $261,506.

Throughout training camp, Milano competed against veterans Ramon Humber and Gerald Hodges for the job as the starting weak side linebacker. Head coach Sean McDermott named Milano the backup weakside linebacker behind Humber to begin the regular season.

On October 8, 2017, Milano earned his first career start and recorded four combined tackles during a 20–16 loss at the Cincinnati Bengals. He earned the start in place of strongside linebacker Ramon Humber, who was ruled inactive due to a broken hand suffered the previous week. On October 22, 2017, he had an impressive performance in his second consecutive start, making five combined tackles, two tackles for a loss, a pass deflection, and recorded his first career interception in the Bills' 30–27 victory over the Tampa Bay Buccaneers. His first career interception was off a pass attempt by Jameis Winston and he returned it 15 yards and received the game ball from head coach Sean McDermott. In Week 8, Milano collected four combined tackles and scored his first career touchdown in the 34–14 win against the Oakland Raiders. In the second quarter of that game, cornerback Leonard Johnson forced a fumble by Raiders' running back DeAndré Washington, that was recovered by Milano and returned 40 yards for a touchdown. The following week, Humber resumed his starting role at weakside linebacker and Milano returned to a reserve role.

On December 10, 2017, Milano was named the starting weakside linebacker over Humber and recorded a season-high 11 combined tackles in a 13–7 victory against the Indianapolis Colts. The next day, defensive coordinator Leslie Frazier stated Milano would remain the starting weakside linebacker barring any unforeseen circumstances. During a Week 17 matchup at the Miami Dolphins, Milano recorded six combined tackles, but ultimately left the 22–16 victory after suffering a hamstring injury. He was listed as inactive and missed the Buffalo Bills 10–3 AFC Wildcard loss at the Jacksonville Jaguars. Milano finished his rookie season with 49 combined tackles (32 solo), two pass deflections, one interception, and a fumble recovery in 16 games and five starts. Pro Football Focus gave Milano an overall grade of 72.2 for 2017. It ranked 41st among all qualifying linebackers and third among all rookie linebackers, behind Reuben Foster (90.7) and Zach Cunningham (80.6).

2018
In Week 3, Milano recorded a sack, an interception, a fumble recovery, two passes defensed and eight tackles in a 27–6 win over the Minnesota Vikings, earning him AFC Defensive Player of the Week. In Week 14, Milano suffered a broken fibula and underwent season-ending surgery. He was placed on injured reserve on December 11, 2018. Milano finished his second professional season with 78 combined tackles, 1 sack, and 3 interceptions.

2019
Milano returned from injury, recording a career high 100 combined tackles along with 1.5 sacks and a forced fumble in 15 starts. As Buffalo also returned to the playoffs, the team faced the Houston Texans in the wild card round. Milano had a game-high 12 tackles, but as the game went into overtime, Milano and Bills safety Siran Neal failed to sack Texans quarterback Deshaun Watson, who spun out of the tackle attempt and completed a pass which set up Houston's game-winning field goal, sealing a 22–19 Bills loss.

2020
In Week 1 against the New York Jets, Milano recorded his first interception of the season during the 27–17 win. He was placed on injured reserve on November 7, 2020, after dealing with a pectoral injury since Week 4. He was activated on December 7.

2021
On March 11, 2021, Milano signed a four-year, $44 million contract extension with the Bills. He recorded his first sack of the season in Buffalo's week two 35–0 victory over the Miami Dolphins. He would record a season-high nine tackles in week ten during a 45–17 win over the New York Jets. Milano finished the season with 86 total tackles, three sacks, a career-high 15 tackles for a loss and five passes defended, as Buffalo finished the season 11–6 and won the AFC East for the second consecutive season.

2022
In Week 2 against the Tennessee Titans, Milano recorded an interception off of Ryan Tannehill and returned it 43 yards for a touchdown in the 41–7 win. In Week 11, he had 12 tackles, three for a loss, a sack, and a fumble recovery in a 31–23 win over the Browns, earning AFC Defensive Player of the Week.  He had an outstanding performance in Buffalo's two playoff games at the end of the season, racking up a total of 20 combined tackles and 3 sacks. Milano was named to the 2023 Pro Bowl Games after Steelers linebacker T.J. Watt forwent the games due to injury.

2023
On March 12, 2023, Milano signed a two-year contract extension with the Buffalo Bills, keeping him under contract through the 2026 season.

NFL career statistics

Regular season

Postseason

References

External links

Boston College Eagles bio

1994 births
Living people
American football linebackers
Boston College Eagles football players
Buffalo Bills players
Players of American football from Orlando, Florida
American Conference Pro Bowl players